Venedeyevka is a rural locality (a village) in Lyakhovskoye Rural Settlement, Melenkovsky District, Vladimir Oblast, Russia. The population was 24 as of 2010.

Geography 
Venedeyevka is located 9 km east of Melenki (the district's administrative centre) by road. Slavtsevo is the nearest rural locality.

References 

Rural localities in Melenkovsky District